Western Rukum a part of Karnali Province, is one of the seventy-seven districts of Nepal. Musikot is the headquarter of the district.

Formally Western Rukum District was part of Rukum District, which divided into two districts Western Rukum and Eastern Rukum after the state's reconstruction of administrative divisions as of 20 September 2015.

Located in the western hill region, Western Rukum is a hill district with many valleys. It is bordered with five districts: Eastern Rukum and Rolpa district of Lumbini province on the east, Salyan district to the south, Jajarkot district on the west, and Dolpa district to the north.

Demographics 
At the time of the 2011 Nepal census, Western Rukum District had a population of 155,383. Of these, 99.3% spoke Nepali, 0.4% Magar, 0.1% Kham and 0.1% other languages as their first language.

In terms of ethnicity/caste, 53.9% were Chhetri, 15.4% Kami, 14.7% Magar, 5.0% Thakuri, 3.8% Hill Brahmin, 3.7% Damai/Dholi, 1.8% Sarki, 0.8% Sanyasi/Dasnami, 0.3% Badi, 0.1% other Dalit, 0.1% Musalman, 0.1% Newar, 0.1% other Terai and 0.1% others.

In terms of religion, 98.1% were Hindu, 0.9% Christian, 0.7% Buddhist, 0.2% Prakriti, 0.1% Muslim and 0.1% others.

In terms of literacy, 64.6% could read and write, 2.5% could only read and 32.9% could neither read nor write.

Transport 
Though Western Rukum is considered a remote district, transportation has been rapidly expanded after the Second People's Movement of 2006. With recent building of roads, bus and jeep services are available with links to the southern plains and major cities including Kathmandu. Two airports offer safe but rudimentary facilities for passenger flights, mainly from Nepalganj and Kathmandu.

The Rapti Highway was under construction (as of 2010) to connect Musikot to Salyan Khalanga, Tulsipur, and Mahendra Highway to the south. On the other hand, Nepal's dream project "Mid-Hill Highway" is under construction.

Rapti Highway 
It is about a four-hour bus ride from Dang Tulsipur to Western Rukum Musikot.

Mid-Hill Highway 
Mid-Hill Highway is under construction. It is a national pride project that passes through 12 zones, 24 districts, and 215 VDCs(old divisions). With a total length of 1,767 km, the highway connects Chiyo Bhanjyang of Panchthar district in the east with Jhulaghat of Baitadi district in the west.

The bus ride from Kathmandu takes up to 24 hours to Musikot.

Airports 
The two airports in  Western Rukum are in Chaurjahari (Nepali: चौरजहारी) and Salle (Nepali: सल्ले).

Chaurjahari Airport lies near the Bheri River, 762 m above sea level and accessible by footpaths and horse trails only, with a grass runway 850 m long and 30 m wide. It was the primary mode of travel to Rukum for government, NGO personnel, aid workers and backpackers before the civil war. During the conflict the security situation deteriorated and the local police station was shut down. The airport has 10 aircraft parking spaces.

The flight from Nepalganj to Rukum Salle airport takes 15–20 minutes.

Rukum Salle Airport lies near Musikot, the district headquarters. It is accessible by foot way and road transport since Rapti Highway has touched Salle airport. Its runway is 650 meters long with capability of parking of four aircraft.

The flight from Kathmandu to Rukum Salle airport takes about 90 minutes, while the flight from Nepalganj takes about 20 minutes.

The district is divided into 3 urban municipalities and 3 rural municipalities

Urban municipalities
 Musikot
 Chaurjahari
 Aathbiskot

Rural municipalities
 Banphikot
 Tribeni
 Sani Bheri

References

External links
 MoFALD
 DCC Rukum
 New districts operating sans admin set-up (the himalayan times)

 
Districts of Nepal established in 2015
Districts of Karnali Province